Yuranan Buadang (born ) is a retired Thai male volleyball player, playing as an outside hitter. He was part of the Thailand men's national volleyball team. He won the silver medal at the 2009 Southeast Asian Games. He participated at the 2010 Asian Games. On club level he played for Federbrau in 2010.

Yuranan played with the national team in 2015. He played the 2017 season on load with the Thai club Air Force.

Clubs 
  Nakhon Ratchasima (2005–)
  Air Force (2017)

Awards

Individual

Clubs 
 2007–08 Thailand League -  Champion, with Nakhon Ratchasima
 2010–11 Thailand League -  Runner-Up, with Nakhon Ratchasima
 2012–13 Thailand League -  Champion, with Nakhon Ratchasima
 2013–14 Thailand League -  Champion, with Nakhon Ratchasima
 2014–15 Thailand League -  Champion, with Nakhon Ratchasima
 2014 Thai–Denmark Super League -  Runner-Up, with Nakhon Ratchasima
 2016 Thai–Denmark Super League -  Champion, with Nakhon Ratchasima
 2016–17 Thailand League -  Runner-up, with Nakhon Ratchasima
 2017 Thai–Denmark Super League -  Champion, with Nakhon Ratchasima
 2017–18 Thailand League -  Champion, with Nakhon Ratchasima
 2018 Thai–Denmark Super League -  Third, with Nakhon Ratchasima
 2019 Thai–Denmark Super League -  Champion, with Nakhon Ratchasima

Royal decorations
 2015 -  Gold Medalist (Sixth Class) of The Most Admirable Order of the Direkgunabhorn

References

1987 births
Living people
Yuranan Buadang
Volleyball players at the 2010 Asian Games
Place of birth missing (living people)
Yuranan Buadang
Yuranan Buadang
Southeast Asian Games medalists in volleyball
Competitors at the 2009 Southeast Asian Games
Competitors at the 2013 Southeast Asian Games
Yuranan Buadang
Yuranan Buadang